The men's 90 kg weightlifting competitions at the 1976 Summer Olympics in Montreal took place on 25 July at the St. Michel Arena. It was the seventh appearance of the middle heavyweight class.

Results

References

Weightlifting at the 1976 Summer Olympics